Striodostomia is a genus of sea snails, marine gastropod mollusks in the family Pyramidellidae, the pyrams and their allies.

Species
Species within the genus Striodostomia include:
 Striodostomia orewa Laws, 1940

References

External links
 To World Register of Marine Species

Pyramidellidae
Monotypic gastropod genera